is a Family Computer video game that was released exclusively for a Japanese market in 1986.

The player controls a red ninja, JaJaMaru, as he progress through a series of Japanesque levels defeating evil spirits that have spread across the land. The player can even ride his faithful frog if he can recover it from hiding.

Items
Soul
Collect 50 of these for an extra life.
Transparent pill
The player becomes transparent and invincible against enemies in addition to their attacks.
Dolly
The player can jump longer distances and at higher speed.
Super Shuriken
Expands the range of the "Fixed Time Shuriken". Help to kill different enemies and their souls can be taken. Also enables every enemy to blow down to size.
Flash
Items such as flashlights. The player can stock up on flashlights and use at any time at the enemy.
Diamond 
Adds a certain amount to the player's score.

Adaptations 
 JaJaMaru no Daibouken was one of the video games bases for the manga Famicom Rocky published by Coro Coro Comics from 1985 to 1987.
 In 1986, JaJaMaru no Daibouken was adapted as a manga by Ōno Katsuhiko. It was released in the Number 12 of part collection  and published by Wan Pakku Comics.

References

1986 video games
Jaleco games
Japan-exclusive video games
Ninja Jajamaru
Nintendo Entertainment System games
Nintendo Entertainment System-only games
Platform games
Video games developed in Japan